Turn On, Tune In, Drop Out is a 1967 album credited to Timothy Leary, created to accompany the documentary film of the same name. It contains narrated meditation mixed with freeform psychedelic rock music.

Track listing
Side A
"The Turn On" - 2:23
"The Tune In" - 3:34
"The Beginning of the Voyage (Heart Chakra)" - 4:01
"Root Chakra" - 2:05
"All Girls Are Yours" - 4:37
"Freak-Out" - 0:29
Side B
"Freak-Out (Continued)" - 3:53
"Genetic Memory" - 6:43
"Re-Entry (Nirvana)" - 3:10
"Epilogue (Turn On, Tune In, Drop Out)" - 2:52

Liner notes
All selections written by Maryvonne Giercarz/Lars Eric/Richard Bond

Guide: Timothy Leary, Ph.D.
Voyager: Ralph Metzner, Ph.D.
Divine Connection: Rosemary Woodruff
Veena: Maryvonne Giercarz
Guitar: Lars Eric
Tabla: Richard Bond

Executive Producer: Henry G. Saperstein
Associate Producer: S. Richard Krown

Special Effects Conception: UPA Pictures, Inc.
Produced by Al Ham
Tape Editor: Dale McKechnie

Notes
Sample from this album were used on the Skinny Puppy song "Left Hand Shake" from their album Last Rights.  Leary agreed for the sample to be used but the copyright holder did not and the song was pulled from the album. Samples were also used on the Nine Inch Nails remix album Fixed.

There were two albums with this name: the 1967 'Original Motion Picture Soundtrack' - Mercury Records 21131 (mono)/61131 (stereo)   - and a prior, 1966 version without music and a different narrative by Leary, possibly recorded at the Millbrook mansion - (ESP-Disk 1027). On it Leary describes the recording location of his narrative as 'On the third floor of the Castilla Foundation' in New York, a countryside house used as a sanctuary for psychedelic experiences.

References

External links
 Full audio at Internet Archive
  (associated documentary film)

1967 albums
Timothy Leary albums
ESP-Disk albums
Mercury Records albums